A Classic Case (1985) is an album by Jethro Tull, playing with the London Symphony Orchestra, released in 1985. The music was arranged and conducted by Dee Palmer, who had collaborated with the band from 1968 and had been a full band member from 1976 to 1980. The album features band members Ian Anderson, Martin Barre, Dave Pegg and Peter-John Vettese.

The album was recorded during the summer of 1984 at the CBS Studios in London. It was released on 31 December 1985 in the United States, where it reached  93 in the charts.

Track listing

Personnel
 Ian Anderson – flute, acoustic guitar
 Martin Barre – electric guitar
 Dave Pegg – bass guitar
 Peter-John Vettese – keyboards
 Paul Burgess - drums, percussion
 London Symphony Orchestra
 Dee Palmer – orchestral arrangements

See also
 Ian Anderson Plays the Orchestral Jethro Tull
 London Symphony Orchestra
 Jethro Tull – The String Quartets

References

1985 albums
Jethro Tull (band) albums
RCA Records albums
Progressive rock albums by English artists
Albums arranged by Dee Palmer